Case Toh Banta Hai is an Indian Hindi language family-friendly sketch comedy show based in a courtroom setting. The show revolves around the concept of charging a few selected big-time Bollywood celebrities, with funny and “Atrangi” allegations and summoning them to the comedy courtroom. Airing on Amazon miniTV, which is a free streaming platform - available on the Amazon Shopping App.

Concept
This weekly show features a courtroom setup where one Bollywood celebrity is summoned every week and tried for all the “Atrangi” and funny allegations they are charged with. Like an actual courtroom, the show has a defense lawyer to help the celebrity walk away clean and a prosecuting lawyer to prove them guilty of all the charges pressed. A judge to give a verdict. A bailiff to stand behind the judge. And a handful of witnesses to shed light on the incidents relating to the allegations. All of this comes with a twist of comedic and "Atrangi" arguments.

Cast

Main Cast
 Riteish Deshmukh as Prosecuting Lawyer aka Janta Ka Lawyer
 Varun Sharma as Defense Lawyer aka Bollywood Insaaf Specialist
 Kusha Kapila as The Judge aka The Judge That Won’t Budge
 Kavin Dave as Bailiff aka Dande Waale Bhaiya

Recurring Cast
 Paritosh Tripathi as Witness
 Gopal Datt as Witness
 Monica Murthy as Witness
 Sanket Bhosale as Witness
 Sugandha Mishra as Witness
 Siddharth Sagar as Witness

List of celebrities appeared on the show
 Varun Dhawan ― July 29, 2022
 Anil Kapoor ― August 5, 2022
 Vicky Kaushal ― August 12, 2022
 Kareena Kapoor Khan ― August 19, 2022
 Badshah ― August 25, 2022
 Sara Ali Khan ― September 1, 2022
 Karan Johar ― September 8, 2022
 Pankaj Tripathi ― September 15, 2022
 Rohit Shetty ― September 22, 2022
 Sonakshi Sinha ― September 29, 2022
 Abhishek Bachchan ― October 6, 2022

Upcoming Celebrity Episodes

 Shahid Kapoor
 Chunky Pandey and Ananya Pandey
 Sanjay Dutt

References

External links
 
 Official website

Indian comedy television series
Hindi comedy shows
Indian television sketch shows
2022 Indian television series debuts